God is the debut studio album of post-punk band Rip Rig + Panic, released on 3 September 1981 by Virgin Records. It took the unusual form of two 12" 45 rpm discs, a format which would be repeated with the group's second album, I Am Cold. In 2013, the album was reissued by Cherry Red Records on CD with an additional tracks taken from singles.

Track listing
All tracks composed by Rip Rig + Panic; except where indicated

Accolades

Personnel
Adapted from the God liner notes.

Rip Rig + Panic
 Sean Oliver – bass guitar, backing vocals (A1)
 Gareth Sager – guitar (A1, B1, B2, B4, D1, D2), clarinet (A1, A3, C1, D2), alto saxophone (D1, D4, 17), keyboards (B1, B3, C1), organ (B1, B3, C1), lead vocals (B1, D3), backing vocals (A1), Japanese marimba (C3), violin (C2)
 Bruce Smith – drums, percussion
 Mark Springer – piano (A1-A4, B1-B4, C2, D2, D4), lead vocals (A3, D4), bass clarinet (C1, D2), trumpet (B4), soprano saxophone (C1), tenor saxophone (C2), backing vocals (C2, D3)
Additional musicians
 Neneh Cherry – lead vocals (A1, B4, C2)
 Ari Up – backing vocals (A3, B1), lead vocals (A4, D1), 
 Dave "Flash" Wright – tenor saxophone (A1, B2, B3), lead vocals (B3)
 Don Cherry - trumpet (19)
 Susan Woo Honeymoon - violin (16, 21)
 Sarah Sarhandi - viola (16, 21)
 Alf Waite - trombone (16, 21)
 Debbie Holmes - cello (16, 21)

Production and additional personnel
 John Dominis – photography
 Howard Gray – engineering
 Dave Hunt – engineering
 Adam Kidron – engineering
 Jill Mumford – sleeve design
 Rip Rig + Panic – production, sleeve design
 John Walker – engineering
 Nick Watson – remastering

Release history

References

External links 
 

1981 debut albums
Rip Rig + Panic albums
Virgin Records albums
Cherry Red Records albums